is a Japanese manga artist best known for creating the manga Guyver.

Career 
Takaya began as a hentai manga artist under the pen name , with several works printed in the adult manga magazine Lemon People, published by Kubo Shoten. The best known of these is Hades Project Zeorymer, which was adapted as a four episode original video animation (OVA) by AIC. He also had stories published in the manga anthology series Petit Apple Pie under this pen name.

Takaya was contributing to Ochazukenori's doujinshi anthology Pen Touch. The work of Ochazukenori was an inspiration to him: "The kind of stories that Nori was drawing weren't what you'd call 'popular.' Our fanzine was the only place where he could create his own ideal manga."

His most successful series Guyver has been adapted into multiple anime features as well as live-action films. Guyver was serialized in Monthly Shōnen Captain (published by Tokuma Shoten) for the lifetime of the magazine from February 18, 1985 to 1997. When Captain was cancelled, the manga moved to Shōnen Ace, published by Kadokawa Shoten, who also reprinted the collected volumes from the beginning. There are 32 tankōbon available.

Works

As Moriwo Chimi
Project Zeorymer (冥王計画ゼオライマー), in Lemon People; October 1983 to November 1984, in Monthly Comic Ryū, June 2007 to August 2007
Ta-ta-ka-e Otō-san (た·た·か·え お父さん!!), in Lemon People, May 1984
ALEF, in Lemon People, February 1985
Cross Fire (クロス·ファイア), single volume, April 1985 , republished 1990-07-10 
Kokoro no Yami ni Ai no Uzu (心の闇に愛の渦), in Lemon People, July 1986

As Yoshiki Takaya
Kyōshoku Sōkō Guyver (強殖装甲ガイバー), in Shōnen Captain, 1985-02-18 to February 1997, resumed in Shōnen Ace

References

Sources
 Landolt-C information on Zeorymer (English version)
 Cross Fire on Kuboama site
 List of H comic back issues and List of Shōnen Captain back issues on Kirara Bunko
 Hanazono Univ A rumor with alma mater of Yoshiki Takaya

1960 births
Guyver (franchise)
Living people
Manga artists from Akita Prefecture